Code Name: The Cleaner is a 2007 American action comedy film directed by Les Mayfield and starring Lucy Liu, Cedric the Entertainer, Callum Keith Rennie and Nicollette Sheridan. The film was released by New Line Cinema on January 5, 2007. Upon its release, the film was met with negative reviews by critics.

Plot 

When Jake (Cedric the Entertainer) awakes one morning in a strange hotel room, he finds himself in a bit of a predicament; there's a corpse in his bed and a briefcase full of cash. Not only that, but he cannot remember who he is or how he got there. He meets Gina (Lucy Liu), a waitress, who tells him he is a janitor at a video-game company and that she is a girlfriend. But Jake believes he is an undercover agent for the CIA, and he tries to figure out the truth.

Cast 
 Lucy Liu as Gina
 Cedric the Entertainer as Jake Rogers
 Nicollette Sheridan as Diane
 Mark Dacascos as Eric Hauck
 Callum Keith Rennie as Shaw
 Niecy Nash as Jacuzzi
 DeRay Davis as Ronnie
 Will Patton as Riley
 Kevin McNulty as Dr. Soames
 Beau Davis as Old Timer
 Bart Anderson as Charlie
 Tom Butler as Crane
 Robert Clarke as The Butler

Reception 
The film received overwhelmingly negative reviews.
Rotten Tomatoes gives the film a score of 4% based on 84 reviews, with an average rating of 3.16/10. The website's critics consensus reads: "Code Name: The Cleaner is a limp action/comedy flick that alternates between lame, worn-out jokes and cheesy martial arts." Metacritic gave the film a score of 33 out of 100, based on 18 reviews, indicating "generally unfavorable reviews".

The film grossed $10.3 million worldwide against a $20 million production budget.

The film received a Razzie nomination for Worst Supporting Actress (Nicollette Sheridan).

Home media 
Code Name: The Cleaner was released on April 24, 2007 and sold 224,724 units translating to revenue of $4,492,233.

See also 
 Mord ist mein Geschäft, Liebling (2009)

References

External links 

 
 
 
 
 

2007 films
American action comedy films
Films directed by Les Mayfield
Films scored by George S. Clinton
Films shot in Vancouver
2000s spy comedy films
Films about amnesia
New Line Cinema films
2007 action comedy films
American spy comedy films
2000s English-language films
2000s American films